Space geodesy is geodesy by means of sources external to Earth, mainly artificial satellites (in satellite geodesy) but also quasars (in very-long-baseline interferometry, VLBI), visible stars (in stellar triangulation), and the retroreflectors on the Moon (in lunar laser ranging, LLR).

See also
Astronomical geodesy

Geodesy
Geodesy